, occasionally miscredited as Masakazu Hirose and nicknamed  for his survival in the naval Battle of the Eastern Solomons, was a Japanese actor. Hirose portrayed Godzilla's archenemy King Ghidorah and King Kong in King Kong vs. Godzilla, along with several "tough guy" roles.

Career 
In 1950, he started working at the Toho, where he played minor roles in films. Due to the popularity of the kaijū-eiga genre, he was interested in playing the monster in one of these films. This opportunity arose in 1962, when Eiji Tsuburaya offered him the role of King Kong in the emerging King Kong vs. Godzilla. Tsuburaya ordered Hirose to go to the zoo and study gorilla behavior in order to better play the role of a monster. In later years, Hirose confessed that he never went to the zoo and then lied to Tsuburaya, saying that he had gained a lot of experience during the alleged visit. Despite his enthusiasm for working with the special effects team, he had difficulty playing King Kong, because the zipper sewn into the costume (in order to hide it) forced him to stay in it for a long time: “Sweat was pouring out of me and even getting into my eyes. After I left [the costume] I was pale."

The next role in a kaijū-type movie was King Ghidorah in Ghidorah, the Three-Headed Monster in 1964, which he received after Haruya Sakamoto, who played him, quit due to his overweight suit. A year later he repeated the role in the Invasion of Astro-Monster. Equally, the film's special effects directors Koichi Kawakita and Teruyoshi Nakano, then assistants to the special effects operator, believed that King Ghidorah in Ghidorah, the Three-Headed Monster was played by Kōji Uruki, who also played Rodan. Kawakita was of the opinion that Hirose could not play Ghidorah due to his short stature.

Hirose was Eiji Tsuburaya's first choice for the role of Sanda in The War of the Gargantuas in 1966, however, he declined, preferring a role he was offered in another film where he could show his face.

In 1971, during the financial crisis that hit Japan, all actors contracted with Toho were restructured, and Hirose remained in the studio as a stage worker, where he worked until the 1990s. However, at the same time, he suffered from a herniated disc and was admitted to the Tokyo Labor Disaster Hospital in Tokyo. He died shortly after living in a nursing home for several years, but the exact date of his death is unknown.

Filmography

Film

1952: Minato e kita otoko
1953: Hana no naka no musumetachi
1954: Zoku Take-chan shacho
1954: Seven Samurai - Bandit #2
1954: Tomei Ningen - Policeman
1955: Godzilla Raids Again - Convict
1955: Oen-san
1955: Half Human - Mountain Searcher
1955: Meoto zenzai
1955: Kaettekita wakadan'na
1956: Samurai III: Duel at Ganryu Island
1956: Ankokugai
1956: Onibi
1956: Hadashi no seishun
1956: Okashi-na yatsu - Daisuke's Friend
1956: Rodan - F-86F pilot (uncredited)
1957: Zoku Goyôkiki monogatari - Travelling salesman
1957: Ôban - The Man On The Train
1957: Salaryman shusse taikôki - Thief
1957: Ikiteiru Koheiji
1957: Tôhoku no zunmu-tachi
1957: Zokuzoku Ôban: Dotô hen - Tahei
1957: The Mysterians - Detective in Etsuko's house
1958: Yagyû bugeichô: Sôryû hiken
1958: Futari dake no hashi
1958: Yajikata dôchû sugoroku
1958: The H-Man - Fire department officer
1958: Varan the Unbelievable - Fisherman
1958: The Hidden Fortress - Yamana soldier
1959: Ankokugai no kaoyaku
1959: Monkey Sun
1959: Kitsune to tanuki
1959: Gigantis, the Fire Monster - Convict
1959: The Three Treasures
1959: Yari hitosuji nihon bare
1959: Bakushô Mito Kômon man'yûki - Gejimasa
1960: Boku wa dokushin shain
1960: Ginza taikutsu musume
1960: The Secret of the Telegian - Onishi's Henchman
1960: Man Against Man - Genpachi
1960: The Human Vapor - Doomed Burly Guard
1961: Nasake muyo no wana
1961: Yojimbo - Ushitora Follower
1961: Nakito gozansu
1961: Mothra - Dam Worker
1961: Arigataya sandogasa
1961: Witness Killed
1962: Sanjuro - Samurai on watch duty
1962: King Kong vs. Godzilla - King Kong
1962: Ankokugai no kiba
1963: Attack Squadron!
1963: Onna ni tsuyoku naru kufû no kazukazu - Detective
1963: Nippon jitsuwa jidai
1963: Chintao yôsai bakugeki meirei
1963: Kureji sakusen: Kudabare! Musekinin
1963: Atragon - Mu Henchman
1963: Honolulu, Tokio, Hong Kong - Shoe maker
1964: Kyô mo ware ôzora ni ari
1964: Nippon ichi no horafuki otoko
1964: Hadaka no jûyaku
1964: Dogora, the Space Monster - Diamond Truck Driver
1964: Horafuki taikôki
1964: Danchi: Nanatsu no taizai
1964: Hana no oedo no musekinin
1964: Ghidorah, the Three-Headed Monster - King Ghidorah
1965: Ankokugai gekitotsu sakusen - Man from Kyushu
1965: Red Beard - Thug
1965: Nippon ichi no goma suri otoko
1965: Taiheiyô kiseki no sakusen: Kisuka - Yamashita
1965: Umi no wakadaishô
1965: Frankenstein vs. Baragon - Tunnel Worker
1965: Crazy Adventure - Police officer
1965: Invasion of the Astro-Monster - King Ghidorah
1966: Bangkok no yoru
1966: The War of the Gargantuas - Soldier
1966: Kureji daisakusen
1966: Godzilla vs. the Sea Monster - Escaped Slave
1967: Kureji ogon sakusen
1967: King Kong Escapes - Henchman #7
1967: Bâkushoyarô daijiken - Kurokawa
1968: Nippon ichi no uragiri-otoko
1969: Nippon ichi no danzetsu otoko
1969: Mito Kômon man'yûki
1970: Nagurikomi Shimizu Minato
1970: Gekido no showashi 'Gunbatsu''' - Hama (uncredited)
1970: Nippon ichi no warunori otoko1971: Battle of Okinawa1971: Nishi no petenshi Higashi no sagishi - Doya's Husband
1971: Nippon ichi no shokku otoko1973: Lady Snowblood1974: Kigeki damashi no jingi1974: Lady Snowblood 2: Love Song of Vengeance1974: Rupan Sansei: Nenriki chin sakusen - Museum Guard
1975: Terror of Mechagodzilla1977: House - Ramen Trucker
1981: Kôfuku - (final film role)

Television
1966: Kaiju Booska''

References

Bibliography

External links

1918 births
Year of death missing
Place of birth missing
Japanese male film actors